Joe Wilson (6 July 1937 – 25 September 2015), was an English footballer who played as a full back. During his professional career he represented Workington (in two spells), Nottingham Forest, Wolverhampton Wanderers and Newport County.

References 

1937 births
Sportspeople from Workington
English footballers
Association football defenders
Workington A.F.C. players
Nottingham Forest F.C. players
Wolverhampton Wanderers F.C. players
Newport County A.F.C. players
English Football League players
2015 deaths
Footballers from Cumbria